Ministry of Defence building may refer to:
Ministry of Defence building (Ukraine)
Main Building of the Ministry of Defense (Russia)
Ministry of Defence headquarters (Thailand)
Ministry of Defence Main Building (United Kingdom)
Yugoslav Ministry of Defence building